Gibbula beckeri is a species of sea snail, a marine gastropod mollusk in the family Trochidae, the top snails.

Description
The size of the shell attains . The shell consists of the protoconch nucleus plus 4 whorls. The profile is rather strongly convex in the upper half of the whorl. There are spiral lirae 2 on 2nd and 3rd whorls, 3 on 4th whorl. These are broad and low, scarcely projecting above the profile, defined by impressed striae, the 3rd being peripheral and feebly carinate; an additional stria (or 2) between 1st and 2nd lirae, and 2-3 between 2nd and 3rd. Sometimes (as in a cotype) only 1 (midwhorl) lira on 2nd and 3rd whorls, but the peripheral one comes into view on 4th whorl. On the base of the shell there is usually a marginal lira and 7-8 weaker lirae, variable.  The umbilicus is not completely closed in the largest shells. The growth lines are distinct.

The colour of the shell is grey or violaceous-grey with white or pale spots, radiating streaks, and/or zigzag marks. Very young shells (up to  diameter) are uniformly violaceous. One specimen is yellowish with darker brown radiating patches forming a band below the suture, similar dark patches on the peripheral lira, between these two bands brown zigzags. Two specimens have red-brown radiating streaks on an emerald-green ground colour on 3rd and 4th whorls, streaks extending on to peripheral lira (cf. capensis). The base of the shell contains grey lirae, or is faintly streaked and spotted.

Distribution
This species occurs in the Atlantic Ocean from Namibia to Port Alfred, South Africa

References

 Kilburn, R.N. & Rippey, E. (1982) Sea Shells of Southern Africa. Macmillan South Africa, Johannesburg, xi + 249 pp. page(s): 40

beckeri
Gastropods described in 1901